Arbon railway station is a railway station in Arbon, in the Swiss canton of Thurgau. It is located on the Lake line of Swiss Federal Railways. It is one of two stations in the municipality; the other, is the next station north on the line.

Services 
 the following services stop at Arbon:

 St. Gallen S-Bahn : half-hourly service between Rorschach and Romanshorn and hourly service to Weinfelden; on Saturdays and Sundays, service every two hours from Rorschach to  via .

References

External links 
 
 

Railway stations in Switzerland opened in 1869
Railway stations in the canton of Thurgau
Swiss Federal Railways stations